GameRevolution (formerly Game-Revolution) is a gaming website created in 1996. Based in Berkeley, California, the site includes reviews, previews, a gaming download area, cheats, and a merchandise store, as well as webcomics, screenshots, and videos. Their features pages include articles satirizing Jack Thompson, E³, the hype surrounding the next-generation consoles, and the video game controversy. Cameo writing appearances include Brian Clevinger of 8-Bit Theatre and Scott Ramsoomair of VG Cats.  The website has also participated in marketing campaigns for video games, including Gauntlet: Seven Sorrows.

Company history
Net Revolution, Inc., a California corporation, was founded in April 1996 by Duke Ferris as a holding company and as the publisher of the GameRevolution website. Ferris served as president of the company until it was acquired in 2005 stock purchase by Bolt Media, Inc. for an undisclosed sum.

E3
The staff of GameRevolution are annual judges at the E3.  Duke Ferris is a returning Judge for the 2010 show.  Perhaps the most influential year for GameRevolution at E3 was in 2000, where they invited Jerry Holkins and Mike Krahulik of Penny Arcade to attend.  They also bestowed Black & White the Best of E3 award.

Purchase by CraveOnline
Following the bankruptcy of Bolt Media, Inc., continuing to be frequented by hundreds of thousands of visitors, GameRevolution was purchased by the men's entertainment site CraveOnline (a division of Atomic Online), for another undisclosed sum. It has since been integrated as part of the CraveOnline community while continuing to stand alone as a popular site. The purchase was announced February 25, 2008.

Features
The feature section commonly includes articles about important gaming events as the Nintendo Summit, and other developers' personal and public congregations and displays. For a number of years, it has also contained the GR Awards for Best, and Worst, of a year in gaming, as well as having buying guides for the Holiday Season. There are also a number of bizarre and unique articles describing phenomena in the gaming community, or simply, interesting news for gamers.

Jack Thompson controversy 

Sometime in August 2005, Jack Thompson contacted Lou Kerner of GameRevolution and requested he remove an "offensive" AIM buddy icon from an affiliate site of GameRevolution known as Bolt.com. Kerner complied and had the offending icon removed immediately. Thompson saw the removal as an admission of guilt and contacted the NYPD to have Kerner arrested; however, no such action was taken. Duke Ferris, another employee of the site, wrote an article on the matter and humorously pointed out the ridiculousness of the entire situation. To drive home this point, he even chose to present a primitively drawn image which had Thompson being devoured by a crocodile, and then challenged Thompson to go ahead and have him arrested.

References

External links
 

Video game news websites
Video game Internet forums
Internet properties established in 1996
Companies based in Berkeley, California